Wang Hai (19 January 1926 – 2 August 2020) was a Chinese fighter pilot and general. A flying ace of the Korean War, he served as commander of the People's Liberation Army Air Force (PLAAF) from 1985 to 1992. He was awarded the rank of general (shang jiang) in 1988.

Biography
Wang Hai was born on January 19, 1926, in Yantai, Shandong Province. He joined the Chinese Communist Party (CCP) in September 1945 when he was a student at Weihai High School, and studied at Linyi People's Revolutionary University in Shandong. In June 1946 he entered Mudanjiang Aviator School, the first aviator training school of the CCP. In May 1950, he graduated from the training program to become a fighter pilot.

During the Korean War (1950–53), Wang was a pilot of the 3rd Fighter Aviation Division. He shot down or damaged nine American aircraft, with his own air group scoring 29. The MiG fighter he flew is exhibited in the Military Museum of the Chinese People's Revolution in Beijing.

After the war, he was promoted to command an air force division, and later commander  of the Guangzhou Military Region Air Force. In 1985, he was appointed commander of the People's Liberation Army Air Force. When the PLA re-instituted military ranks, he was awarded the rank of general (shang jiang) in September 1988. He retired in 1992. Starting with him all PLAAF commanders have been career aviators.

Wang Hai was a member of the 13th and 14th Central Committees of the Chinese Communist Party.

On 19 October 2010 he led a Chinese delegation to Pyongyang to commemorate the 60th anniversary of the entry of the Chinese People's Volunteers into the Korean War.

Wang died on 2 August 2020, aged 94.

See also
List of Korean War flying aces

References 

1926 births
2020 deaths
Commanders of the People's Liberation Army Air Force
Chinese Korean War flying aces
People's Liberation Army generals from Shandong
People from Yantai
Members of the 13th Central Committee of the Chinese Communist Party
Members of the 14th Central Committee of the Chinese Communist Party